Chews Resolution Manor, also known as Avoca, Resolution Manor, is a historic home and slave plantation located south of Ellicott City, Howard County, Maryland.

Avoca was patented by Samuel Chew in 1695 as "Chews Resolution Manor" and "Chews Vineyard". In 1877, the property was listed as part of the prominent Dr. Michael Pue's estate of 176-acres sold to Alfred W. Thoms. The land at the time was described as being "on the road from the Columbia Turnpike to Elkridge Landing and to Waterloo at the terminus of the 'New Cut Road' ... The neighborhood is noted for the salubrity of its climate, the beauty of its scenery, and the culture and elegance of its residents. Mrs. Comfort W. Dorsey, Messrs. James Clark, John C. White, Henry Winter, I. Monroe Mercer and Captain Jonett U.S. Navy, are among the nearest neighbors. ... The Dwelling is of Granite ... The Barn is immense."

See also
List of Howard County properties in the Maryland Historical Trust
Clark's Elioak Farm
Fairfield Farm
MacAlpine

References

Houses completed in 1718
Howard County, Maryland landmarks
Houses in Howard County, Maryland
Buildings and structures in Ellicott City, Maryland
1718 establishments in the Thirteen Colonies
Plantation houses in Maryland